The Arizona Women's Hall of Fame recognizes women natives or residents of the U.S. state of Arizona for their significant achievements or statewide contributions. In 1979, the office of Governor Bruce Babbitt worked with the Arizona Women's Commission to create the Hall of Fame. The first inductees were in October 1981. During its first decade, the Hall of Fame was overseen by the Arizona Historical Society and the Arizona Department of Library, Archives and Public Records.  A steering committee would each year select a varying number of women to be inducted.  The 1991 inclusion of  Planned Parenthood creator Margaret Sanger resulted in disapproval being heard from some in the Arizona Legislature, and funding dried up.  With the lone exception of María Urquides in 1994, there were no Hall of Fame inductees for over a decade. Inductions finally resumed in 2002, and since that year the Hall of Fame has only inducted new honorees every two years.

Current sponsorship of the Arizona Women's Hall of Fame is provided by the Arizona Department of Library, Archives and Public Records, the Arizona Historical Society, Arizona Humanities Council, Governor's Division for Women and the Sharlot Hall Museum.

Inductees

Notes

References

Further reading

External links
 Arizona Women's Hall of Fame

Women's halls of fame
Lists of American women
State halls of fame in the United States
Women in Arizona
Halls of fame in Arizona
Lists of people from Arizona
History of women in Arizona